Peter van der Westhuizen (born 21 December 1984) is a retired South African middle-distance runner who specialised in the 1500 metres. He represented his country at the 2009 World Championships and 2010 World Indoor Championships.

International competitions

Personal bests
Outdoor
800 metres – 1:47.60 (Padova 2009)
1000 metres – 2:17.81 (Stockholm 2009)
1500 metres – 3:35.33 (New York 2009)
One mile – 3:54.90 (Oslo 2010)
3000 metres – 8:00.05 (Luzern 2010)
Indoor
800 metres – 1:49.98 (Lincoln 2007)
1000 metres – 2:23.41 (Lincoln 2007)
1500 metres – 3:42.38 (Birmingham 2010)
One mile – 3:59.43 (Winston-Salem 2013)
3000 metres – 8:07.50 (Lincoln 2008)
5000 metres – 14:20.65 (Lincoln 2008)

References

1984 births
Living people
South African male middle-distance runners
South African people of Dutch descent
World Athletics Championships athletes for South Africa
South African expatriates in the United States